Stefano Pessina (born 4 June 1941) is an Italian-Monegasque billionaire businessman; he is the executive chairman and largest single shareholder of Walgreens Boots Alliance.

Early life
Pessina was born in Pescara and grew up between Milan, Como and Naples.

He graduated from the Polytechnic University of Milan in nuclear engineering before starting his career in academia and later joining market research firm ACNielsen in Milan. He wanted to be a nuclear physicist, but was discouraged by the tumultuous political climate of 1970s.

Career
In 1977, Pessina took over his family's pharmaceutical wholesaler (possibly Petrone Group) in Naples, Italy, and turned it into Alliance Santé, a Franco-Italian pharmaceutical wholesale group. In 1997, it merged with Alliance UniChem. From 2001 to 2004, he served as its CEO. He served as deputy chairman, and later as chairman. The company merged with Boots Group PLC in 2006 and was taken private in July 2007. Pessina was chairman of Alliance Boots from 2007 to 2014 and currently serves as Executive Chairman of Walgreens Boots Alliance (here, "WBA"). Pessina is also a director of WBA. He is a director of the Consumer Goods Forum.

In a 31 January 2015 interview for The Sunday Telegraph, Pessina commented on the prospect of Britain's Labour Party winning the UK general election in May 2015, "If they acted as they speak, it would be a catastrophe ... The problem is would they act that way or not? One thing is to threaten and to shout but it is completely different to be in charge and to manage the country day-to-day." He described Labour's business policies as "not helpful for business, not helpful for the country and in the end it probably won’t be helpful for them". The Sunday Telegraph noted that Pessina "declined to elaborate on which specific policies he disliked".

On Sunday 1 February, Labour's shadow Business Secretary Chuka Umunna, responded in The Independent, "The British people and British businesses will draw their own conclusions when those who don’t live here, don’t pay tax in this country and lead firms that reportedly avoid making a fair contribution in what they pay purport to know what is in Britain’s best interest." On 2 February, in a live Q&A session with Sky News, the Labour Party leader Ed Miliband said, "The chairman of Boots lives in Monaco and doesn't pay British taxes ... I don't think people should take kindly to being told how to vote by someone who avoids paying his taxes."

On 2 February, Walgreens Boots Alliance stated, "The comments made by Stefano Pessina were a small part of a much larger conversation and have been taken out of context ... Stefano Pessina was expressing his personal views only and is not campaigning against Ed Miliband or the Labour Party." On 6 February, Allister Heath, deputy editor of The Telegraph, described the "attacks" by Labour and Liberal Democrat politicians on Pessina, "one of the world’s greatest entrepreneurs", as being "as nonsensical as they were indefensible".

In July 2020, it was announced that Pessina would step down as CEO of WBA to take a "less hands on role" and replace Jim Skinner as executive chairman.

Personal life
Pessina is married to Ornella Barra; she is chief operating officer, international of Walgreens Boots Alliance.

Pessina was previously divorced and has two adult children.

According to Bloomberg Billionaires Index, Pessina's net worth was estimated at US$10.3 Billion as of August 2021.

Awards and honors
2013, Grande ufficiale dell'Ordine della Stella d’Italia
2016, Special Achievements Award in Business by the National Italian American Foundation (NIAF)
2017, Golden Plate Award of the American Academy of Achievement
2018, World Retail Hall of Fame

References

External links
Stefano Pessina Official website

1941 births
Polytechnic University of Milan alumni
Italian chief executives
Italian billionaires
Monegasque billionaires
Monegasque businesspeople
People from Monte Carlo
People from Pescara
Living people
People named in the Panama Papers
Walgreens people
Italian emigrants to Monaco
Naturalized citizens of Monaco